Ek Baar Chale Aao is a 1983 social film by Abdul Sattar Khan starring Deepti Naval and Farooq Shaikh in the lead roles. It was released on 20 January 1983.

Plot
Dharam Das has found an ideal groom for his sister in Din Dayal, who agrees to wed her. However, on the day of the wedding, Din demands an exorbitant amount of dowry, and when Dharam is unable to come up with it, breaks off all ties, returns home, and marries another woman. This completely devastates the Das family, the to-be bride kills herself, and the shock of her death kills her father, and Dharam swears to avenge this humiliation at all and any costs. Years later Din has a daughter by the name of Gulab, who is in love with Kamal, the son of Dharam. When Dharam finds out, he is enraged and refuses to permit Kamal to marry her, but when Kamal insists, Dharam reconsiders and permits the marriage to take place. After the marriage, Gulab is found in the bridal chamber with another man, Ravi; while Kamal is nowhere to be found. The next day Dharam takes Gulab back to Din's house and demands that he be paid 25 Lakhs as dowry. A bewildered Din, who had put all this in the past, is unable to come up with the money, but agrees to keep Gulab with him, get her divorced and remarried to Madan Lal. The question remains where was Kamal on the night of his marriage, and was he also involved in this plot to humiliate Din?

Soundtrack

Cast

References

1983 films
1980s Hindi-language films